Sagrada is a Spanish word meaning "sacred".

It may refer to:
Sagrada, Missouri, a community in the United States
La Sagrada Família, a church in Barcelona, Spain
Rhamnus purshiana, a medical plant commonly called cascara sagrada ("sacred bark")